Wenn der letzte Schatten fällt is the third studio album by the Austrian electronic music band L'Âme Immortelle. The 2004 re-release featured three additional live tracks that were not available on the original Trisol release.

Track listing

References

L'Âme Immortelle albums
1999 albums
GUN Records albums